Nabhani may refer to:

 Nabhani dynasty, rulers of Oman between the 12th and 17th century
 Fatma Al-Nabhani, Omani tennis player
 Kamal al-Din al-Nabhani, Lebanese politician
 Mohammed Al-Nabhani, Omani former tennis player
 Taqiuddin al-Nabhani, Palestinian Muslim scholar and philosopher
 Yusuf an-Nabhani, Palestinian Muslim scholar and philosopher
Surnames of Palestinian origin

Arabic-language surnames
Surnames of Omani origin
Surnames of Lebanese origin